Rud Ab District is a district (bakhsh) in Sabzevar County, Razavi Khorasan Province, Iran. At the 2006 census, its population was 14,611, in 4,163 families.  The District has one city: Rud Ab. The District has three rural districts (dehestan): Frughan Rural District, Khavashod Rural District, and Kuh Hamayi Rural District.

References 

Districts of Razavi Khorasan Province
Sabzevar County